Jón is an Old Norse common name still widely used in Iceland and the Faroes.
According to Icelandic custom, people named Jón are generally referred to by first and middle names and those without a middle name are referred to with both first name and patronym  disambiguation is required.

Jón is derived from the name Johannes (English John) with the original meaning being God (Yahweh) is gracious. The name is one of the most frequently given names in Iceland. In 2002, it was ranked first before Sigurður and Guðmundur.

People with the name Jón

Kings 

 Jón I of Sweden

Others 

 Jón Hnefill Aðalsteinsson, Icelandic scholar and folklorist
 Jón Arason, Icelandic bishop
 Jón Árnason (author), Icelandic author
 Jón Loftur Árnason, Icelandic chess player
 Jón Þór Birgisson, Icelandic musician (Sigur Rós)
 Jón Gerreksson, Danish-Icelandic bishop
 Jón Gnarr, Icelandic comedian
 Jón Baldvin Hannibalsson, Icelandic politician
 Jón Helgason (poet), Icelandic philologist and poet
 Jón Helgason (minister), Icelandic politician and former minister
 Jón korpur Hrafnsson, son of Þuríður Sturludóttir
 Jón Hreggviðsson, character in Iceland's Bell by Halldór Laxness
 Jón Kristjánsson, Icelandic cross country skier
 Jón Rói Jacobsen, Faroese football defender
 Jón Ásgeir Jóhannesson, CEO of Baugur Group
 Jón Leifs, Icelandic composer
 Jón Loftsson, Icelandic chieftain at Oddi
 Jón Magnússon (politician), Icelandic politician
 Jón Arnar Magnússon, Icelandic decathlete
 Jón Ólafsson, Icelandic editor, journalist, and poet
 Jón Ögmundsson, Icelandic bishop
 Jón frá Pálmholti, Icelandic writer
 Jón Kalman Stefánsson, Icelandic author
 Jón Páll Sigmarsson, Icelandic weightlifter and powerlifter
 Jón Sigurðsson, Icelandic politician
 Jón Trausti Sigurðarson, Icelandic newspaper editor
 Jón Jósep Snæbjörnsson, Icelandic musician
 Jón Arnór Stefánsson, Icelandic basketball player
 Jón Sveinsson, Icelandic author
 Jón Thoroddsen junior, Icelandic author
 Jón Thoroddsen elder, Icelandic author
 Jón Þorláksson, Icelandic Prime Minister

See also 
 Jon

References

Masculine given names
Faroese masculine given names
Icelandic masculine given names